Pseudosphenoptera nephelophora is a moth in the subfamily Arctiinae. It is found in Brazil.

References

Natural History Museum Lepidoptera generic names catalog

Arctiinae
Taxa named by George Hampson
Lepidoptera of Brazil
Moths described in 1914